Rugby union in Guyana is a minor but growing sport. They are currently ranked 66th by the IRB, with 1032 registered players.

Guyana is geographically in South America, but competes in North American competitions, and is a member of NAWIRA as its rugby contacts tend to be with the Caribbean nations, rather than the Southern Cone

Governing body 
The national governing body is the Guyana Rugby Football Union.

History
Guyana is a former British colony, known as "British Guiana", and the game there was introduced to there by the British. For a number of years, the local rugby scene was dominated by expatriates.

In 1954, the Argyll and Sutherland Highlanders regiment was stationed in Guyana, and formed their own team to play local sides in the colony. They played sides formed of British and Portuguese residents of Georgetown and the sugar estates. The soldiers had not played for a long while, but had an advantage due to their physical fitness.

Guyana has done particularly well in the Caribbean Sevens.

It also supports two national teams.

See also 
 Guyana national rugby union team 
 Guyana women's national rugby union team

External links
 IRB Guyana page
 NAWIRA Guyana page
 Guyana rugby team selected for North American West Indian Rugby Association Men’s 15s Championship (Voice of Guyana)
 Guyana looking to make rugby history
 Guyana’s men’s and women’s Sevens Rugby team off to NAWIRA IRB World Cup Qualifiers (Stabroek News)
 Archives du Rugby: Guyana

References